Cayo Fragoso Lighthouse is a Cuban lighthouse located in Cayo Fragoso, a resort island of the municipality of Caibarién, Villa Clara Province.

See also

 List of lighthouses in Cuba
 Cayo Caiman Grande de Santa María Lighthouse

References

Lighthouses in Cuba
Buildings and structures in Villa Clara Province
Lighthouse Cayo Fragoso
Lighthouses completed in 1930
20th-century architecture in Cuba